Comptus stenurus, the Hispaniolan keeled galliwasp or Cope's galliwasp, is a species of lizard of the Diploglossidae family endemic to the Caribbean island of Hispaniola (in both the Dominican Republic and Haiti).

Taxonomy
It was formerly classified in the genus Celestus, but was moved to Comptus in 2021.

References

Comptus
Reptiles described in 1862
Endemic fauna of Hispaniola
Taxa named by Edward Drinker Cope